A slogan is used in Scottish heraldry as a heraldic motto or a secondary motto. It usually appears above the crest on a coat of arms, though sometimes it appears as a secondary motto beneath the shield. The word slogan dates from 1513. It is a variant of the earlier slogorn, which was an Anglicisation of the Scottish Gaelic sluagh-ghairm (sluagh "army", "host" + gairm "cry"). In other regions it is called war-cry.

Mottoes and heraldry

There are several possible origins for mottoes used in heraldry, and slogans may have originated from battle cries or war cries. There are several notable heraldic mottoes which are thought to originate from a war cries. For example, the Royal coat of arms of the United Kingdom contains the motto  ("God and my right") which has been thought to originated as a war cry, as has the motto  which appeared on the former French coat of arms. Several mottoes found in Irish heraldry, which end in a boo, are also thought to have originated as war cries.

Not all slogans are based on war cries. Many slogans pertaining to Scottish clan chiefs have been registered relatively recently at the Court of the Lord Lyon. Sometimes slogans are merely a name, such as A HOME A HOME A HOME of the Homes, others refer to a rallying point for the clan, like  of the Campbells, some slogans refer to a prominent clansman like the Maclean  ("Another for Hector"). In at least one case, a patron saint is used as a slogan, as in St Bennet and Set On of the Setons. The arms of Grant use two slogans (or mottoes): , which appears above the crest; and STANDFAST, which appears beneath on a scroll beneath the shield. Sometimes a clan chief's slogan appears on his crest badge and in consequence on the crest badges worn by his clan members. In some cases the chief's slogan also appears on his standard, guidon and pinsel.

Slogans

Notes

Citations

References

 
Heraldry